Homero de Miranda Leão (1 January 1913 – 8 August 1987) was a poet, teacher and politician. He was born in Maués, Amazonas, Brazil, the son of Manuel José de Miranda Leão and Eponina Martins de Miranda Leão, he was married to Letícia Faraco de Miranda Leão.

In his home town of Maués, he was a noted teacher of Portuguese.  As a member of the Union of Brazilian Writers and the Amazonian Academy of Letters he has published two editions of a book of poems titled Mundurucânia.  He was recognised by several major awards, particularly from Ipiranga and the Governor of São Paulo.

1913 births
1987 deaths
People from Amazonas (Brazilian state)
Mayors of places in Brazil